The 1976 Western Championships, also known as Cincinnati Open, was a men's tennis tournament played on outdoor clay courts at the Sunlite Swim and Tennis Club at Old Coney in Cincinnati, Ohio in the United States. It was the 76th edition of the tournament and was part of the Three Star category of the 1976 Commercial Union Assurance Grand Prix circuit. The tournament was held from July 12 through July 18, 1976. Second-seeded Roscoe Tanner won the singles title.

Finals

Singles
 Roscoe Tanner defeated  Eddie Dibbs 7–6, 6–3
 It was Tanner's 1st singles title of the year and the 5th of his career.

Doubles
 Stan Smith /  Erik van Dillen defeated  Eddie Dibbs /  Harold Solomon 6–1, 6–1

References

External links
 
 ATP tournament profile
 ITF tournament edition details

Cincinnati Open
Cincinnati Masters
Cincinnati Open
Cincinnati Open
Cincinnati Open